The 1963 Macdonald Brier, the Canadian men's national curling championship, was held from March 4 to 8, 1963 at the Wheat City Arena in Brandon, Manitoba. A total of 42,113 fans attended the event.

Team Saskatchewan, who was skipped by Ernie Richardson captured the Brier Tankard by finishing round robin play with a 9–1 record. This would be Saskatchewan's fifth Brier championship and the fourth one in five years that Richardson had skipped. Unlike their previous three Brier championships, the Richardson rink won with a different lead as Mel Perry replaced Ernie's cousin, Wes Richardson due to back issues.

The championship was essentially decided in the penultimate 10th draw, when Saskatchewan (with a 7–1 record at the time) played against Alberta (8–1). The 10th draw drew a capacity crowd of 4,211, with fans lining up hours before the draw in sub-zero temperatures to claim the last remaining seats. In the game, Alberta took a 5–4 lead after six ends. However, Saskatchewan scored a three-ender in the seventh, when Ernie Richardson made a precise angle take-out with back ring weight around a guard. Alberta skip Jimmy Shields was heavy on both his draws in the ninth end, missing a chance to score two. He over compensated in the 10th end, coming up short on his final draw, with Saskatchewan ending up scoring two, to take a 7–5 lead. In the 11th end, Shields was forced to draw against three on his last rock, and came up short again, giving up a steal of three, to go down 10–5. Alberta scored three in the final end, but it wasn't enough, losing to Saskatchewan by a final score of 10–8. With Alberta having the bye in the final draw, Saskatchewan still had to win their final match against Prince Edward Island to claim the championship, which they did 10–4. 

This was also the fourth instance in which a skip had won back-to-back Brier championships and the second time that Richardson had done so as he previously achieved this in 1959 and 1960. As of 2022, Richardson is the only skip to win back-to-back Briers on two separate occasions.

Teams
The teams are listed as follows:

Round-robin standings

Round-robin results
All draw times are listed in Central Time (UTC-06:00)

Draw 1
Monday, March 4 3:00 PM

Draw 2
Monday, March 4 8:00 PM

Draw 3
Tuesday, March 5 9:30 AM

Draw 4
Tuesday, March 5 3:00 PM

Draw 5
Wednesday, March 6 3:00 PM

Draw 6
Wednesday, March 6 8:00 PM

Draw 7
Thursday, March 7 9:30 AM

Draw 8
Thursday, March 7 3:00 PM

Draw 9
Thursday, March 7 8:00 PM

Draw 10
Friday, March 8 9:30 AM

Draw 11
Friday, March 8 3:00 PM

References

External links 
 Video: 

Macdonald Brier, 1963
The Brier
Curling competitions in Brandon, Manitoba
Macdonald Brier
Macdonald Brier